Ten of Diamonds is a 1917 American silent drama film directed by Raymond B. West and starring Dorothy Dalton, Jack Livingston, and J. Barney Sherry.

Cast
 Dorothy Dalton as Neva Blaine 
 Jack Livingston as Warren Kennedy 
 J. Barney Sherry as Ellis Hopper 
 Dorcas Matthews as Blanche Calloway
 Billy Shaw (Undetermined Role)

References

Bibliography
 Robert B. Connelly. The Silents: Silent Feature Films, 1910-36. December Press, 1998.

External links

1917 films
1917 drama films
1910s English-language films
American silent feature films
Silent American drama films
American black-and-white films
Films directed by Raymond B. West
Triangle Film Corporation films
1910s American films